Pierfranco Vianelli (born 20 October 1946) is a former Italian cyclist and Olympic Champion. He won a gold medal at the 1968 Olympic Games in Mexico City, in the Individual Road Race. He also won a bronze medal in the Team Time Trial.

References

External links
 
 

1946 births
Living people
Italian male cyclists
Cyclists at the 1968 Summer Olympics
Olympic gold medalists for Italy
Olympic bronze medalists for Italy
Olympic cyclists of Italy
Cyclists from the Province of Brescia
Olympic medalists in cycling
Medalists at the 1968 Summer Olympics